Atabak or Atabek may refer to:
 Atabak, Fars
 Atabak, Kurdistan
 Atabak, Tehran
 Atabak, Yazd